The Boracay-class patrol boat is a series of four patrol boats built by OCEA of France for the Philippine Coast Guard based on the Ocea FPB 72 design. Based on their hull number prefix "FPB", they are officially classified as "fast patrol boats".

Ships in class

References

Naval ships of the Philippines
Auxiliary search and rescue ship classes